HMS Jervis, was a J-class destroyer of the Royal Navy named after Admiral John Jervis (1735–1823). She was laid down by R. and W. Hawthorn, Leslie and Company, Limited, at Hebburn-on-Tyne on 26 August 1937. The ship was launched on 9 September 1938 and commissioned on 8 May 1939, four months before the start of the Second World War.

However, despite an impressive war record (she earned 13 battle honours) she remains virtually unknown compared to her sister, Kelly.

Service history

1939 (Home Waters)
When war broke out in September 1939, Jervis was under the command of Captain Philip Mack, and was leader of the 7th Destroyer Flotilla (DF) based in the Humber. The first six months of hostilities was taken up with sweeps across the North Sea, in "appalling weather conditions" which saw the Flotilla suffer a succession of storm and collision damage. During this time Jervis captured three blockade runners, one on the second day of the war, and helped search for the merchant ship . In March 1940 Jervis was involved in a collision with SS Tor, a Swedish freighter, that put her in dock for the next three months for repairs.

1940 (Mediterranean)
Jervis''' pennant number changed to G00 around this time In July, after working-up trials, she joined him in Malta, where he resumed command. For the next two years Jervis saw action in a constant round of operations; sweeps along the coast, bombarding shore targets for the Army, protecting convoys to Malta, and screening major fleet movements.

1941
In 1941 Jervis was involved in a number of fleet actions. In March she was at Battle of Cape Matapan. Then Jervis came alongside Pola and boarded her, taking off the wounded before, with the destroyer , torpedoing and sinking Pola. In April she led the force that annihilated an Axis convoy at the action off Sfax. In May she was in the Battle of Crete, where many Royal Navy ships were lost, including her sister ship Kelly. During the summer Jervis ran supplies to the beleaguered port of Tobruk and in December led the destroyers at the First Battle of Sirte. On returning to Alexandria, she was damaged in an Italian human torpedo attack which left her in dock for six weeks. Her Chaplain, George Sherlock, was awarded the DSC for "outstanding zeal, patience, and cheerfulness and for setting an example of wholehearted devotion to duty."

1942
Released at the end of January, she resumed operations. In April she joined the Malta Strike Force, although without Mack who left Jervis in March due to ill-health and was replaced as captain of Jervis, and Captain (D), by A.L Poland. He would command her, and lead the 14th Destroyer Flotilla, for the next year. In March 1942, under Poland's leadership, she again led the destroyers at the Second Battle of Sirte.

1943
On the night of 1/2 June, an Italian convoy of two supply ships escorted by a destroyer and a torpedo boat, was intercepted off the Straits of Messina by Jervis (commanded by Captain A.F Pugsley) and the Greek destroyer Queen Olga. A Wellington bomber dropped flares and after a short battle lasting half an hour, the two Allied destroyers sank the .Jervis also saw action during the landings in Sicily, Calabria, Salerno, and Anzio, as well as operations in the Adriatic. She supported both the Eighth Army and Yugoslav partisans. In the Autumn of 1943 Jervis was in the Aegean supporting the ill-fated operation against the Dodecanese Islands.

1944 (Home Waters)
Having returned to Britain after a re-fit, and no longer Flotilla leader, Jervis saw action at the Normandy landings under Lieutenant Commander Roger Hill, and in the closing stages of the war. She was decommissioned in September 1944, paying off at Chatham prior to a further, major re-fit.

1945 and post-war
Re-commissioned in May 1945, Jervis saw further service in the Mediterranean, policing the aftermath of World War II. She paid off into the reserve at Chatham in May 1946, and was then laid-up in the Gareloch where she was used for training of local Sea Cadets. Placed on the Disposal List in October 1947, she was one of a number of ships used for explosives trials in Loch Striven during 1948.

FateJervis was handed over to the British Iron and Steel Corporation for demolition in January 1949 and allocated to Arnott Young, arriving at Troon, on the Firth of Clyde for breaking up in September.

"Lucky Jervis"Jervis had a reputation as a lucky ship (in contrast to her sister, Kelly, who seemed to have more than her share of bad luck). Despite a long and active career, in 5½ years of war and 13 major actions, not one of her crew was lost to enemy action, possibly a unique record. An example of her luck might be seen in her action at Anzio in January 1944. Supporting the landing with gunfire, Jervis and her sister ship, Janus, were attacked by enemy aircraft using Henschel Hs 293 glider bombs. Both were hit; Janus’ forward magazine exploded, sinking her with the loss of nearly 160 of her crew; Jervis’ bow was blown off, leaving her to be towed stern-first to safety. Astonishingly, not one of her crew was harmed in this incident, and she was able to rescue over 80 of Janus’ crew.

Battle honoursJervis was awarded 13 battle honours for her service during the Second World War.HMS Jervis; Battle Honours at britainsnavy.co.uk; retrieved 8 July 2020
 Mediterranean 1940–44 
 Libya 1940–42 
 Malta convoys 1941–42
 Matapan 1941 
 Sfax 1941 
 Crete 1941 
 Sirte 1942
 Sicily 1943 
 Salerno 1943 
 Aegean 1943 
 Adriatic 1944
 Anzio 1944 
 Normandy 1944

Notes

See also
 Raid on Alexandria (1941)

References
 
G.G.Connell, Mediterranean Maelstrom: HMS Jervis and the 14th Flotilla'' (1987)

External links

 HMS Jervis on naval-history.net
 HMS Jervis at uboat.net
 HMS Jervis at britainsnavy.co.uk

 

J, K and N-class destroyers of the Royal Navy
Ships built on the River Tyne
1938 ships
World War II destroyers of the United Kingdom